Shirley Hubertina Maria Adriana Kocaçınar (born 4 December 1986) is a   footballer who plays as a forward, currently playing for Fortuna Sittard. Born in the Netherlands, she represented Turkey at international level, making her debut in 2011.

Playing career

Club
Kocaçınar played in the first season of the BeNe League, Premier Women's League, at Willem II. After one year, she moved to Roda JC, where she scored four goals in eleven league games. As her club folded due to financial problems, she transferred to RKTSV Kerkrade in the 2009–10 season. She returned to the Premier League with VVV-Venlo in the 2010–11 season. After the termination of her contract, she returned to her former club RKTSV Kerkrade, where she scored 15 goals in 12 matches becoming topscorer. In the 2012–13 season, Kocaçınar transferred to Fortuna Sittard.

In January 2013, she tried to transfer to the Turkish team Trabzon İdmanocağı without success due to problems with documentation.

Kocaçınar plays also futsal for the Sittard-based club FSG Gezien.nl.

International
In the possession of a Turkish passport, she was called up to the Turkey team. She took part in friendly international matches in 2011. In the match against Greece on April 29, 2011, she scored two goals. She capped four times for the Turkey women's national team.

Honours

Individual
Top scorer 2011–12 season with RKTSV Kerkrade

See also
 Turkish women in sports

References

1986 births
Sportspeople from Heerlen
Dutch women's footballers
Turkish women's footballers
Women's association football forwards
Turkey women's international footballers
Living people
Dutch people of Turkish descent
Dutch women's futsal players
Eredivisie (women) players
Willem II (women) players
VVV-Venlo (women) players
Footballers from Limburg (Netherlands)